Harry Kenny (born 13 April 1962) is an Irish footballer who last managed at St Patrick's Athletic before resigning in August 2019. During his playing career he spent 13 seasons playing for Shamrock Rovers.

Harry, or 'H' as his friends nicknamed him, came to Milltown in September 1978, one year after Johnny Giles had been appointed player/manager. He was a number of full-time players who Giles signed up as part of the policy to develop a full-time professional set up at Milltown. Other players who were involved in the scheme at the time were Pierce O'Leary, Alan Campbell and Ritchie Bayly.

Harry made his Rovers debut on 20 December 1978 in a Leinster Senior Cup quarter final win against Dunleary Celtic at Tolka Park. His league debut came on 3 April 1979 in a 4–0 win against Cork Celtic at Milltown. Along the way to senior status Harry picked up a few honours. He was capped for the Irish schoolboys at U15, U17 and youths level.

In his only his second full season at Milltown H won the Player of the Year award Shamrock Rovers#Player of the Year

When he became a regular in the first team, Harry proved to be quite impressive but just when everything was going very well he broke his leg against Sligo in a league game at Milltown on 11 October 1981. It was a major setback for H and it took a long time for him to return to his original form. One man's loss is another man's gain, the injury to Harry opened up an opportunity for Peter Eccles who then claimed a regular spot in defence keeping H out of the team.

In April 1983 he played for the League of Ireland XI U21s against their Italian League counterparts who included Roberto Mancini and Gianluca Vialli in their team.

Harry didn't get much of a look during Jim McLaughlin's first season in charge, 1983/84, he only made a total of five appearances but he admitted himself it was his own fault. He stalled in renewing his contract and although he had played quite well in a few pre-season friendlies he had kept McLaughlin waiting and that led to H losing his place to Anto Whelan.

If H missed out on a league winners medal in 83/84 he made up for it the following year when he won 2 league medals! With both the first and second teams winning their respective leagues Harry had made enough appearances for both teams to claim a medal for both. To add to that he won two more league medals and three FAI Cup's as Rovers continued to dominate the league right through to 1986/87. In addition to schoolboy and youth international honours Harry has also played for the League of Ireland XI in 7 Olympics qualifiers.

Perhaps the shortest game of his entire career happened at Dalymount Park on 19 January 1986 when he was red carded after just 4 minutes after a brief altercation with Tom Conway (footballer).

He scored his first goal for the Hoops on 3 December 1980 in a Leinster Senior Cup semi final loss to UCD. He also scored the first goal from the penalty spot in the 1987 FAI Cup Final

In 1982 Harry spent 6 months at Vancouver Whitecaps.

On 3 June 1990 Harry had a testimonial luncheon in his honour which was attended by members of Ireland's UEFA Euro 1988 squad which included ex teammate Liam O'Brien.

Harry's final appearance was at the RDS against Dundalk on 15 April 1991. It was his 300th competitive appearance in the green and white.

He then joined Drogheda United where he played for 2 seasons before retiring. The move was not without controversy however

His first game against Rovers resulted in a win and the subsequent sacking of Noel King

Harry's family are steeped in Rovers tradition. His father in law is Hughie Gannon who won the FAI Cup with Rovers in 1955 and his younger brother Marc Kenny played for the Hoops in the late 90s.

At the 2007 Shamrock Rovers Player of the Year Awards Harry Kenny was the Hall of Fame recipient.

Coaching
Harry's first foray into management came with his local junior team, Kinvara Boys, who were then playing in the Athletic Union League Premier A Division. Kenny managed the Navan Road outfit from the 94/95 season until his departure in the close season of 96/97.

He managed Phoenix in the Leinster Senior League and the Republic of Ireland women's national under-17 football team.

He was manager of Bray Wanderers in 2016 and 2017 as well as managing St Patrick's Athletic in 2019.

Honours
Shamrock Rovers 
League of Ireland: 4
 1983/84, 1984/85, 1985/86, 1986/87
 FAI Cup: 3 1985, 1986, 1987LFA President's Cup: 2 1984/85, 1987/88SRFC Player of the Year':
 1980/81

 Sources 
 The Hoops'' by Paul Doolan and Robert Goggins

References

Republic of Ireland association footballers
Republic of Ireland youth international footballers
Association football defenders
Shamrock Rovers F.C. players
Drogheda United F.C. players
Crusaders F.C. players
Newry City F.C. players
NIFL Premiership players
League of Ireland players
Association footballers from Dublin (city)
1962 births
Living people
League of Ireland XI players
Leinster Senior League (association football) managers
Bray Wanderers F.C. managers
St Patrick's Athletic F.C. managers
Republic of Ireland football managers
People educated at St. Declan's College, Dublin